The 44th Annual Tony Awards to honor achievement in Broadway theatre was held on June 3, 1990, at the Lunt-Fontanne Theatre and broadcast by CBS television. The hostess was Kathleen Turner.

The ceremony
The theme, "The Year of the Actor," featured classic monologues from As You Like It (Morgan Freeman); Hamlet (Kevin Kline); Long Day's Journey Into Night (Len Cariou); The Royal Family (Geraldine Fitzgerald); The Tempest (Philip Bosco).

Presenters and Performers: Philip Bosco, Matthew Broderick, Len Cariou, Dixie Carter, Michael Crawford, Sandy Duncan, Morgan Freeman, Helen Hayes, Dustin Hoffman, James Earl Jones, Kevin Kline, Linda Lavin, Bernadette Peters, Christopher Reeve, Joan Rivers, Ron Silver, Jessica Tandy, Lily Tomlin.

Musicals and Plays represented:
 Aspects of Love ("Love Changes Everything" - Company)
 City of Angels ("What You Don't Know About Women" - Kay McClelland and Randy Graff / "You're Nothing Without Me" - Gregg Edelman and James Naughton)
 Grand Hotel ("We'll Take a Glass Together" - Michael Jeter, Brent Barrett and Company)
 Meet Me in St. Louis ("Banjos"/"The Boy Next Door"/"The Trolley Song"/"Meet Me in St. Louis"- Company)
 The Grapes of Wrath (Scene with Gary Sinise, Lois Smith and Company)
 Lettice and Lovage (Scene with Maggie Smith and Margaret Tyzack)
 The Piano Lesson (Scene with the company)
 Prelude to a Kiss (Scene with Timothy Hutton, Mary-Louise Parker, Barnard Hughes and Company)

Winners and nominees
Winners are in bold

Special awards
The Regional Theatre Award was presented to the Seattle Repertory Theatre. The Tony Honor Award was presented to  Alfred Drake for Excellence in the Theatre.

Multiple nominations and awards

These productions had multiple nominations:

12 nominations: Grand Hotel
11 nominations: City of Angels 
8 nominations: The Grapes of Wrath 
6 nominations: Aspects of Love 
5 nominations: Gypsy and The Piano Lesson
4 nominations: Lettice and Lovage, Meet Me in St. Louis, The Merchant of Venice and Sweeney Todd
3 nominations: Cat on a Hot Tin Roof   
2 nominations: Prelude to a Kiss

The following productions received multiple awards.

6 wins: City of Angels 
5 wins: Grand Hotel 
2 wins: The Grapes of Wrath, Gypsy and Lettice and Lovage

See also
 Drama Desk Awards
 1990 Laurence Olivier Awards – equivalent awards for West End theatre productions
 Obie Award
 New York Drama Critics' Circle
 Theatre World Award
 Lucille Lortel Awards

External links
44th Tony Awards Official Site

Tony Awards ceremonies
1990 in theatre
1990 theatre awards
Tony
1990 in New York City
1990s in Manhattan